Danny Bruno (born August 13, 1952) is an American theater, television and film actor. He is perhaps best known for portraying Bud Wurstner on the NBC fantasy drama Grimm.

Early life and education
Bruno was born in The Bronx, New York. From 1970 to 1974 he studied at State University of New York at Cortland where he obtained a Bachelor of Arts degree in Early Secondary English.

Theatre
After relocating to the Pacific Northwest in 1976, Bruno was an English teacher from 1976 to 1978. In 1979, he began his career in acting. Since then, he has had major roles in hundreds of plays throughout the Northwest at the Oregon Shakespeare Festival, Portland Center Stage, New Rose Theater, Artists Repertory Theatre, Oregon Repertory Theatre, Lakewood Theatre Company, Hult Center for the Performing Arts, Actor's Cabaret of Eugene, Northwest Classical Theatre, Profile Theatre and Stark Raving Theatre among others.  On June 13, 2005, the Drammy Committee presented Bruno with a Drammy award for Outstanding Supporting Actor for his portrayal of Dave Moss in David Mamet's Glengarry Glen Ross.

Television
Bruno's television roles include Bud Wurstner in Grimm (TV series) (2011–2017), Portlandia (TV series) (2014), Agent Bob in Leverage (TV series) (2010–2011), Officer Dixon in In the Line of Duty: Blaze of Glory (TV Series) (1997), Nowhere Man (TV series) (1995) and Without Warning: Terror in the Towers (1993). On October 13, 2014, Oregon Media Production Association presented Bruno with the Best Male Actor Award 2014 for his work in Grimm and Portlandia.

Film
On the big screen, he has appeared in such films as What the #$*! Do We (K)now!?, Without Evidence, Have You Seen Clem?, Wake Before I Die, Kicking Bird, Guns on the Clackamas: A Documentary, Hope, Black Santa's Revenge, Forge and Come Hell or Highwater.

He currently lives in Portland, Oregon, and had a recurring role as Bud Wurstner in the NBC fantasy drama Grimm.

References

External links 
 Danny Bruno – IMDB
 Danny Bruno – Casting Frontier
 KGW Talk Box with Danny Bruno
 Danny Bruno in Portland Starlight Parade 2012
 Danny Bruno in SAG-AFTRA TV Spot

1952 births
Living people
State University of New York at Cortland alumni
American male stage actors
People from Commack, New York
American male television actors
Male actors from Portland, Oregon